82nd Regiment of Foot may refer to one of three regiments of the British Army that have been numbered the 82nd Regiment of Foot

82nd Regiment of Foot (Invalids), renumbered the 72nd Regiment of Foot (Invalids) in 1764
82nd Regiment of Foot (Prince of Wales's Volunteers)
82nd Regiment of Foot (1777)